The American System-Built Homes were modest houses designed by architect Frank Lloyd Wright. They were developed between 1912 and 1916 to fulfill his interest in affordable housing. Wright was devoted to the idea of providing beautiful yet affordable homes to the public. His firm produced over 960 drawings for the project, the largest number of drawings for any project in the Wright archives. The designs were standardized, and customers could choose from seven models. Because of this standardization, the lumber could be precut at the factory, thereby cutting down on both waste and the amount of skilled labor needed for  construction. The buildings are often termed prefabricated homes, but they were not, since no parts of the homes were constructed off-site. The lumber was cut at the factory, packaged along with all other components, and delivered to the work site for construction.  Some are located in a federal historic district in Milwaukee, Wisconsin, and others have been designated Chicago Landmarks in Chicago, Illinois.

Manufacture and sales 
In 1911, Arthur L. Richards and a partner contracted with Frank Lloyd Wright to design a hotel in Lake Geneva, Wisconsin. After this, Richards learned of Wright's new American System-Built Homes, and in 1914 began construction on six as demonstrator models. Richards gained the exclusive rights to manufacture and distribute the homes. He sold franchises to market the homes, and allowed only approved contractors to build them. He had offices in Milwaukee, the Chicago area, Champaign, Decatur and Gary. The Richards Company milled the lumber, cut it to specification, and packaged all the materials needed for construction, including plaster, paint, windows, hardware and fixtures. The customer purchased a complete home, so in addition to the materials, skilled craftsmen were provided.
 
In April 1917, the United States entered World War I, and building materials were diverted to the war effort, stalling new home building. Later that year, Wright, dissatisfied with Richards, sued him for nonpayment of royalties and fees, and the project came to an end. It is believed that about 25 System-Built Homes were constructed, but only about 15 survive. They can be found in Wisconsin, Illinois, Indiana, and Iowa.

Burnham Street Historic District, Milwaukee 

The original six homes built in the Burnham Park neighborhood of Milwaukee by Arthur Richards were added to the National Register of Historic Places in 1985. There are four model 7a duplexes, a model B1 bungalow, the only example of its kind, and a model C3 bungalow. It is the only known grouping of System-Built homes, and the only grouping of Frank Lloyd Wright homes that includes both duplexes and single-family dwellings. Three of the homes have been purchased by the Frank Lloyd Wright Wisconsin Program. The B1 bungalow was restored in 2010, with one of the duplexes to follow. They are located in the 2700 block of West Burnham Street, at South Layton Boulevard.

American System Built Homes in the Burnham Street District:
 Arthur L. Richards Duplex Apartments - referred to as either "Model 7a Duplexes", "Model C" or "Model F" - 4 units, 3 identical units (2720-2730 West Burnham), the 4th unit (2732-2734 West Burnham) is a mirror image. The second house from the west has been converted to a single family home.  Built 1915.
 Arthur L. Richards Small House - "Model B1" or "Cottage B" located at 2714 West Burnham Street. Built 1915.
 Richards Bungalow - "Model C3" or "Cottage A" located at 1835 South Layton Boulevard.  Built 1915. This house was resurfaced in precast coral stone veneer in 1956.

The Arthur R Munkwitz Duplex Apartments were pair of four-unit apartment buildings built in 1916. The Munkwitz Duplexes were based on a different System Built plan and constructed on 1102-1112 N. 27th St - a few blocks north of the Burnham Street Historic District. They were demolished in 1973.

American System-Built Houses, Chicago 
On July 13, 1994, the Mayor and City Council of Chicago designated two System-Built Homes as Chicago Landmarks. Built in 1917, they are located at 10410 (the Guy C. Smith House) and 10541 S. Hoyne Avenue (the H. Howard Hyde House). The first, at 10410 Hoyne, was intended to be the first of a subdivision of the homes. Both the Smith and Hyde Houses are two story, single-family units.

Other American System-Built Homes 

Bungalow style units based on the "C3" or "Cottage A" design:
 Lewis E. Burleigh House - Wilmette, Illinois (1915)
 Ida and Grace McElwain House - Lake Bluff, Illinois (1915)
 Stephen M. B. Hunt House II - Oshkosh, Wisconsin (1917)

Single story, single-family units:
 The Elizabeth Murphy House (A203) - Shorewood, WI (1917)

Two story, single-family units:
 Wilbur Wynant House - Gary, Indiana (1916)
 Oscar A. Johnson House - Evanston, Illinois (1917)
 Delbert W. Meier House - Monona, Iowa (1917)
 Charles Heisen House - Villa Park, Illinois (1917)

2000s revival 
In 1999 it was announced that an update of the American System-Built Homes would be part of a renewal of Atlantic City, New Jersey. Taliesin Associated Architects were contracted to design new homes based on the original designs. They were expected to sell for $125,000 to US$150,000, similar to the originals in that the cost was relatively low.

Recently identified but not verified 

In 2008, Wright scholar, William Allin Storrer unveiled his controversial 29 undiscovered Frank Lloyd Wright works.  One of these houses was the Thomas E. Sullivan House at 336 Gregory Avenue in Wilmette, Illinois, next door to the Burleigh House at 330 Gregory Ave.  In 1989, Storrer had previously identified the 1916 house as the work of John S. Van Bergen even though the residence does not appear in Martin Hackl's complete catalog, The Works of John S. Van Bergen, Architect. In his 2008 findings, Storrer revised his claim, then stating that the Sullivan House was actually an American System-Built Home with a dining room addition by Van Bergen. Excluding the alleged addition, the main block of the Sullivan House is nearly identical to that of the Wynant House; only the entrance and garage orientation, a missing bedroom above the garage, and differences in trim details distinguish these two residences.  Storrer's assertion is further substantiated by a drawing from the Frank Lloyd Wright Foundation which shows Model D-101 with the Sullivan House entrance and without the Wynant House garage wing.

Storrer also identified three potential single-story American System-Built Homes in Berwyn, Illinois. One, the Chester Bragg House (1916), is located at the 6644 34th Street at the corner of Wesley Avenue and has a Model B1 plan.

See also 
 National Register of Historic Places listings in Milwaukee County, Wisconsin
 List of Chicago Landmarks

Notes

References 
 Storrer, William Allin. The Frank Lloyd Wright Companion. University Of Chicago Press, 2006,  (S.200, S.201, S.202, S.203, S.204)

External links

 Wright in Milwaukee
 600 Fillmore, Gary, Indiana
 Plan of model C3
 The Elizabeth Murphy House
 Richards Bungalow on dgunning.org
 H. Howard Hyde House
 H. Howard Hyde house on peterbeers.net
 H. Howard Hyde house on dgunning.org
 Guy C. Smith House
 Guy C. Smith house on peterbeers.net
 Guy C. Smith house on dgunning.org
 Frank Lloyd Wright 'American System-Built Houses' (American System Ready-Cut) 1911 - 1917, ONLINE SOURCES:
 2720 West Burnham Street in the Library of Congress
  is an example of Wright's plans and drawings that the Wisconsin Historical Society has online.  To see others, enter "American System-Built" in the Search at the top of that page.

Frank Lloyd Wright buildings
1910s architecture in the United States
Houses in Milwaukee
Houses in Chicago
Houses on the National Register of Historic Places in Wisconsin
Historic districts on the National Register of Historic Places in Wisconsin
National Register of Historic Places in Milwaukee